Kris Feddersen (born October 30, 1963) is an American freestyle skier. He competed in the men's aerials event at the 1994 Winter Olympics.

References

External links
 

1963 births
Living people
American male freestyle skiers
Olympic freestyle skiers of the United States
Freestyle skiers at the 1994 Winter Olympics
Sportspeople from Cincinnati